The 1998–99 Azadegan League was the eighth season of the Azadegan League that was won by Persepolis. The following is the final results of the Azadegan League's 1998–99 football season.

Final classification

Results table

Summary

 Iranian football champions: Persepolis
 Relegated: Malavan, Shahrdari Tabriz, Poly Acryl, Bank Melli
 Promoted: Bahman, Irsotter Noshahr

Player statistics

Top goalscorers

14
 Kourosh Barmak (Teraktor Sazi)
 Abdoljalil Golcheshmeh (Aboomoslem)

References
 
 https://www.persianleague.com/iranian-leagues/table/8-azadegan-league-azadegan-league-1998-1999

Azadegan League seasons
Iran
1998–99 in Iranian football